Alberta has provincial legislation allowing its municipalities to conduct municipal censuses. Municipalities choose to conduct their own censuses for multiple reasons such as to better inform municipal service planning and provision, to capitalize on per capita based grant funding from higher levels of government, or to simply update their populations since the last federal census.

Alberta began the year of 2020 with 351 municipalities, which decreased to 349 on February 1 with the dissolutions of the Town of Granum and the Village of Gadsby. Of these, at least 13 published their intentions to conduct a municipal census in 2020. However, 10 of these municipalities cancelled their intentions.

Morinville was the lone municipality to achieve a population milestone as a result of its 2020 municipal census. It surpassed the 10,000-mark making it eligible for city status.

Cancelled municipal censuses 
The following 10 municipalities intended to conduct a municipal census in 2020 but did not follow through.

Airdrie
Banff
Calgary
Camrose
Lethbridge
Raymond
Red Deer
Strathcona County
Municipal District of Taber
Regional Municipality of Wood Buffalo

Municipal census results 
The following summarizes the results of the numerous municipal censuses conducted in 2020.

Breakdowns

Hamlets 
The following is a list of hamlet populations determined by the 2020 municipal census conducted by the County of Newell.

See also 
List of communities in Alberta

References

External links 
Alberta Municipal Affairs
Alberta Municipal Affairs: Municipal census
Alberta Municipal Affairs: Municipal population lists
Statistics Canada
Statistics Canada: Census Program

Local government in Alberta
Municipal censuses in Alberta
2020 censuses
2020 in Alberta